David William Reid (born May 15, 1964) is a Canadian former ice hockey left winger. He played in the National Hockey League with the Boston Bruins, Toronto Maple Leafs, Dallas Stars and the Colorado Avalanche.

Playing career
Selected in the 1982 NHL Entry Draft by the Boston Bruins, Reid spent his first few seasons between the parent club and the minors. In 1988, he signed as a free agent with the Toronto Maple Leafs. After three seasons in Toronto, he returned to Boston where he would play for the next five seasons.

Reid signed with the Dallas Stars in 1996, and in 1999, he helped the Stars win their first Stanley Cup. Reid scored a personal best 10 playoff points while skating on a line with Jamie Langenbrunner and Joe Nieuwendyk. Reid would move on and sign with the Colorado Avalanche after the season, where he would play for the last two years of his NHL career. In 2001, he added a second Stanley Cup to his resume while with the Avalanche.

In 961 NHL games, Reid scored 165 goals and 204 assists for a total of 369 points.

Post-retirement
Since retirement, Reid has moved into the field of broadcasting. He is frequently seen as one of several rotating analysts on the NHL Network's nightly "NHL On The Fly" television program. He was also the colour commentator for the gold medal game of the 2009 World U-17 Hockey Challenge on TSN in Port Alberni.

On May 4, 2010, Reid was hired as the General Manager of the OHL's Peterborough Petes. The team failed to make the playoffs in either 2011 or 2012, and, after a slow start to the 2012–13 season, he was fired on October 9, 2012. Reid currently serves as an analyst for NHL Network & TSN.

Career statistics

References

External links

Dave Reid's profile at hockeydraftcentral.com

1964 births
Living people
Boston Bruins draft picks
Boston Bruins players
Canadian ice hockey left wingers
Canadian television sportscasters
Colorado Avalanche players
Dallas Stars players
Hershey Bears players
Maine Mariners players
Moncton Golden Flames players
Peterborough Petes (ice hockey) players
Providence Bruins players
Sportspeople from Etobicoke
Ice hockey people from Toronto
Stanley Cup champions
Toronto Maple Leafs players
Toronto Varsity Blues ice hockey players